Keirra Trompf (born 16 September 1985 in Warrnambool, Australia) is a former Australian netball player in the ANZ Championship, playing for the Queensland Firebirds.

References

1985 births
Living people
Australian netball players
Queensland Firebirds players
ANZ Championship players
People from Warrnambool
Netball players from Victoria (Australia)